Gaura may refer to:

 Gaura - genus of flowering plants
 Gaura - a Hindu festival celebrated in Nepal
 Gaura, Jamo, a village in Uttar Pradesh, India
 Gaura, Kapurthala - village in Kapurthala district of Punjab State, India
 Gaura, Raebareli, a village in Uttar Pradesh, India
 Gaura, Unnao, a village in Uttar Pradesh, India
 Gaura - a chiefdom in Sierra Leone
 Gaura Caitanya Mahaprabhu - Gauranga Gaurahari Gauracandra Gaurasundara Gaura-Nitai / GAURA as referenced in the Sri Caitanya Upanishad glorifying Indian Vaishnava saint Sri Krsna Caitanya (1486–1534) 
 Guara, an alternate name for the  Bengali Hindu mystic Caitanya Mahaprabhu